Furdjel Robby Narsingh (born 13 March 1988) is a Dutch professional footballer who plays as a winger. He formerly played for AZ, Volendam, Telstar, PEC Zwolle, SC Cambuur, De Graafschap and Ararat-Armenia.

Career
Born in Amsterdam, Narsingh began his career with Zeeburgia and later joined Jong Ajax. In summer 2006 he signed with AZ Alkmaar and was loaned out in July 2008 to FC Volendam till 30 June 2009.

On 19 June 2009, the 21-year-old striker joined Telstar for the 2009–10 season on loan from AZ Alkmaar.

On 6 July 2011 Furdjel Narsingh joined FC Zwolle. He promoted to the Eredivisie in 2013.

On 28 May 2014, Narsingh signed a one-year deal with SC Cambuur, with an option for another season.

In July 2017, he joined League One side Oxford United on trial. However, he was originally confused for his brother Luciano on the team sheet and the club's social media.

In October 2017, after one year without a team he rejoined SC Cambuur.

Personal life
Narsingh is of Indian-Surinamese descent and has a brother called Luciano who plays for Sydney FC.

Career statistics

Club

Honours

Club
PEC Zwolle
KNVB Cup (1): 2013–14
Eerste Divisie (1): 2011–12

Ararat-Armenia
 Armenian Premier League (1): 2019–20
 Armenian Supercup (1): 2019

References

External links
 
 Voetbal International profile 
 

Living people
1988 births
Association football midfielders
Dutch footballers
Dutch expatriate footballers
AFC Ajax players
FC Volendam players
A.V.V. Zeeburgia players
SC Telstar players
AZ Alkmaar players
PEC Zwolle players
SC Cambuur players
De Graafschap players
FC Ararat-Armenia players
Eredivisie players
Eerste Divisie players
Armenian Premier League players
Expatriate footballers in Armenia
Dutch sportspeople of Surinamese descent
Dutch people of Indian descent
Sportspeople of Indian descent
Footballers from Amsterdam